Marčić is a surname. Notable people with the surname include:

Filip Marčić (born 1985), Croatian footballer
Milan Marčić (born 1996), Serbian footballer

See also
Martić

Croatian surnames
Serbian surnames